Singhapitiya is a village located in Central Province, Sri Lanka near the town of Gampola. One of the earliest coffee plantations of Sri Lanka, Mariawatte, was situated nearby Singhapitiya.

Populated places in Kandy District